Bjerre is a Danish surname. Notable people with the surname include:

Andreas Bjerre (1879–1925), Swedish academic 
Jens Bjerre (disambiguation), multiple people
Jonas Bjerre (born 1976), Danish musician
Jonas Buhl Bjerre (born 2004), Danish chess master
Kenneth Bjerre (born 1984), Danish motorcycle speedway rider
Kresten Bjerre (1946–2014), Danish footballer
Lasse Bjerre (born 1993), Danish motorcycle speedway rider
Morten Bjerre (born 1972), Danish handball player
Poul Bjerre (1876–1964), Swedish psychiatrist
Sys Bjerre (born 1985), Danish singer-songwriter

Danish-language surnames